The 1984–85 DDR-Oberliga was the 36th season of the DDR-Oberliga, the first tier of league football in East Germany.

The league was contested by fourteen teams. BFC Dynamo won the championship, the club's seventh of ten consecutive East German championships from 1978 to 1988, thereby surpassing the record of six titles jointly held up to then by BFC Dynamo, Dynamo Dresden and FC Vorwärts Berlin.

Rainer Ernst of BFC Dynamo was the league's top scorer for the second time in a row with 24 goals, while Hans-Jürgen Dörner of Dynamo Dresden again took out the seasons East German Footballer of the year award.

On the strength of the 1984–85 title BFC Dynamo qualified for the 1985–86 European Cup where the club was knocked out by FK Austria Wien in the first round. Second-placed club Dynamo Dresden qualified for the 1985–86 European Cup Winners' Cup as the seasons FDGB-Pokal winners and lost to Bayer Uerdingen in the quarter finals, in a game dubbed the Miracle of the Grotenburg.

Third-placed 1. FC Lokomotive Leipzig qualified for the 1985–86 UEFA Cup where it was knocked out by AC Milan in the second round while fourth-placed BSG Wismut Aue lost to FC Dnipro Dnipropetrovsk in the first round.

Table									
The 1984–85 season saw two newly promoted clubs, Stahl Brandenburg and BSG Motor Suhl.

Results

References

Sources

External links
 Das Deutsche Fussball Archiv  Historic German league tables

Ober
1984-85
1